The Medina Province is a province (minṭaqah) of Saudi Arabia, located on the country's western side, along the Red Sea coast.

The regional capital is Medina, the second-holiest city in Islam. Other cities in the province include Yanbu' al Bahr and Badr Hunayn. It also contains Mada'in Saleh, a UNESCO World Heritage Site.

Population

Governors 
 Muhammad bin Abdulaziz (1926-1954)
 Abdul Muhsin bin Abdulaziz (1965-1985)
 Abdul Majeed bin Abdulaziz (1986-1999)
 Muqrin bin Abdulaziz (1999-2005)
 Abdulaziz bin Majid (2005-2013) 
 Faisal bin Salman bin Abdulaziz Al Saud (2013–Present)

See also 
 Sarat Mountains
 Hijaz Mountains
 Tihamah

References

External links 
Emirate of Al Madinah Official website

 
Provinces of Saudi Arabia